Moon bounce may mean:
 Earth-Moon-Earth communication
 Communication Moon Relay, a 1950s US Navy project
 Inflatable castle, children's recreational structure